There will be a maximum of 130 competitors, and each NOC is allowed to enter a maximum of four athletes each in dressage and jumping and five athletes each in eventing. National federations are required to send to FEI a Certificate of Capability for the 2011 Pan American Games with a record of results for all riders and horses intending to compete no later than midnight (Switzerland time) on Monday, July 11, 2011.

Qualification summary

Dressage
Riders and horses must obtain qualification for the 2011 Pan American Games at events that take place from January 1, 2010
until July 10, 2011. All rider and horse combinations must have achieved a minimum qualification criteria by the date mentioned above which is to have achieved 60% in a FEI Prix St Georges Test 2000 on two occasions, in a CDI or a National Dressage event.

The following countries have qualified:

Team

Individual

Eventing
Riders and horses must obtain qualification for the 2011 Pan American Games at events that take place from January 1, 2010
until July 10, 2011. All rider and horse combinations must have achieved the 2 (two) minimum eligibility results as follows:
 1 CCI2
 1 CIC2

The following countries have qualified:

Team

Individual

Jumping
All riders must have competed in at least one CSI event of any category prior to or in the year of the Pan American Games until July 10, 2011.

The following countries have qualified:

Team

Individual

References

Qualification for the 2011 Pan American Games
Equestrian at the 2011 Pan American Games